The Minister for Rural Affairs was a ministry in New South Wales. It was initially established as an addendum to the Agriculture portfolio, adding responsibilities for rural land protection and rural adjustment grants. It was first established in the first Greiner ministry in 1988 and abolished in 1993. It was re-established in the second Carr ministry and abolished in 2011, with the responsibilities absorbed into the Primary Industries portfolio.

List of Ministers for Rural Affairs

References

Rural Affairs